The Ozzy and Friends Tour is a concert tour that replaced the majority of the original 2012 dates of the Black Sabbath Reunion Tour.

On 17 February 2012, Black Sabbath reshuffled its reunion plans in light of guitarist Tony Iommi's battle with lymphoma. The band confirmed that they planned to play only one show on their planned European tour - Download Festival, which took place on 10 June in England. In between the lone performance, Ozzy Osbourne headed out on a 17-date tour as part of Ozzy & Friends, which featured special guests including Slash, Zakk Wylde, Tom Morello and Sabbath's own Geezer Butler on select dates. In 2015, a similar outcome came along, and Sabbath  had to pull away from some dates in their 2015 schedule including the 2015 installment of the Japanese Ozzfest. and Ozzy Osbourne and Friends had replaced those slots. The 20 June 2015 concert in Mannheim, Germany was canceled after the opening band, Black Label Society had completed their set due to vocal problems on Osbourne's part.

Tour dates

Personnel
Ozzy Osbourne – vocals 
Geezer Butler – bass (selected dates)
Zakk Wylde – guitar (selected dates)
Slash – guitar (selected dates)
Adam Wakeman - keyboards/guitar
Gus G - guitar
Blasko - bass
Tommy Clufetos - drums
Tom Morello - guitar (Ozzfest Japan 2015)

Supporting Acts
Black Label Society - Europe 2012
Alkbottle - Vinenna, Austria (26/6/12)
Judas Priest - Latin America 2015
Motörhead - Latin America 2015
 Zerodoze - Porto Alegre, Brazil (30/4/15)

External links
 Official Black Sabbath site
 Black Sabbath on Facebook
 Black Sabbath on Twitter

References

2012 concert tours
2015 concert tours